Langenberg Wildlife Park is a zoo situated in the municipality of Langnau am Albis in the Sihl Valley to the south of the city of Zürich in Switzerland. The wildlife park now forms part of the Zürich Wilderness Park.

The park was founded in 1869 by the Zürich city forester Carl Anton Ludwig von Orelli, making it the oldest Swiss wildlife park. In 2009, the management of the Langenberg Wildlife Park was combined with that of the nearby Sihlwald forest, to form the Zürich Wilderness Park.

Langenberg is home to 16 native or formerly native animals such as bears, beavers, elk, hare, lynxes, wild boar, and wolves. In 2012, European bison and Przewalski’s horse were introduced to the park.

The wildlife park can be reached via the Wildpark-Höfli railway station, served by service S4 of the Zurich S-Bahn.

References

External links 
 
 Pages on the wildlife park from the Wildnispark Zürich web site (in German)

Langnau am Albis
Zoos established in 1869
Zoos in Switzerland
1869 establishments in Switzerland
Articles needing infobox zoo
Wildlife parks